Neve is a band consisting of Angela John, Daniel Sherman and Paul Newton. They're notable for releasing a vocal version of Y-Traxx's Mystery Land which they added additional lyrics. It reached No.70 in UK Singles Chart in 2003.

References

British musical trios